Gender asymmetry is an aspect of the constructed international auxiliary language Esperanto which has been challenged by numerous proposals seeking to regularize both grammatical and lexical gender.

In the text below, when a proposed word or usage is not grammatically correct according to the standard rules of Esperanto grammar, it will be marked with an asterisk (*).

Gender in Esperanto 

Esperanto does not have grammatical gender other than in the two personal pronouns  "he" and  "she" and their derivatives. Nevertheless, gender is often a fuzzy issue. In practical usage words formed with the suffix - "person" are ambiguous, sometimes used with a masculine meaning in the singular, but generally neutral in the plural. However, concepts of gender have changed over time, and many words that were once considered masculine are now neutral, especially words related to professions and animals. In older texts it is only context that disambiguates. For example, in the saying  "to a happy man, even a  gives eggs" (Zamenhof), the word  means "cockerel/rooster", not "chicken". However, this can be confusing to those who are not familiar with that saying, as the word  has become more neutral over time.

In modern usage, most noun roots are lexically neutral, a couple of dozen are lexically masculine, and a smaller number lexically feminine. Most masculine roots may be made feminine through the addition of the suffix - and made to describe a group of both males and females with the addition of -. For example,  means "father",  "mother", and  "parents", but  cannot be used traditionally in the singular  for "parent". For these gendered words there is no easy way to make the singular neutral equivalent. Often there is a separate root that acts like this, for example  "boy" →  "child";  "son" →  "offspring", etc. Some neutral counterparts can be made with word-building. The meaning of "parent" can be achieved with either  "genitor", or  "member of the parents". However, it is more common to simply say  "one of the parents" or  "father or mother".

The most common roots that are masculine unless specifically marked as feminine are:
Kin terms:  "grandfather",  "husband",  "fiancé",  "son",  "brother",  "grandson",  "nephew",  "uncle",  "father",  "widower",  "(male) cousin"
Words for boys and men:  "boy",  "man"

Gender-neutral roots such as  "lion" and  "waiter" may be made feminine with a grammatical suffix ( "lioness",  "waitress"), but there is no comparable way to derive the masculine; there was not even originally a word for "male". Zamenhof used the nominal root  "man, human male" to make words for animals masculine. Originally this took the form of a suffix -, but in response to criticisms that the resulting words such as  "bull" were ambiguous with mythological man–animal hybrids such as minotaurs (also ), Zamenhof switched to using  as a prefix in his translation of Genesis finished in 1915. This usage has spread, and - is now widely used as a prefix in the case of animals ( "male-lion",  "male-human"), but as a separate adjective  for professions ( "male waiter"), with - now considered archaic, though neither of these conventions is as common as feminine -.

Common elements to regularizing Esperanto gender 
Critics such as Dale Spender and Veronica Zundel feel that deriving feminine from masculine words causes women to be either "linguistically excluded… or else named negatively", while others are bothered by the lack of symmetry. Such sentiments have sparked numerous attempts at reform, none of which have been accepted by the Akademio de Esperanto.

Reforms tend to address a few key areas:
A masculine suffix, parallel to the feminine -
An epicene affix
An epicene pronoun (like s/he or singular they in English)

Three specific proposals surface repeatedly, as they derive from the existing resources of the language. These are the masculine suffix *-, workarounds and expanded uses of the epicene prefix -, and the epicene pronoun .

Masculine suffixes 
The most popular proposal for a masculine grammatical suffix is *-.

While preparing his Reformed Esperanto of 1894, Zamenhof considered *- as a masculine grammatical suffix.
He considered a male suffix logical but a complication for learners as it was against national customs. 
Other proposals have been suggested.  was created through ablaut of -. (It is, in fact, the only such possibility, as -, -, and - already exist.) Similarly, *- was created through ablaut of - "person". *- was created by analogy with the pet-name suffix -, the only masculine suffix in the language, so that pet names and the gender suffixes would be symmetrical:

An element common to all such proposals is that the gender-changing nouns are to be reanalyzed as gender neutral when they occur without a gender suffix, as the names of professions and nationalities came to be treated in the mid twentieth century, such as  "policeman" → "police officer" and  "Englishman" → "English person". This doesn't affect all words: Nouns that never changed gender to begin with, such as  "bull", do not take gender suffixes in these reforms either. The resulting paradigms are as follows:

The most common objection to the  proposal is the very analysis of words such as "patro" as gender neutral. The reason behind the objection is that the specifically masculine words are defined as such in the Fundamento, and it is felt that reanalyzing them as gender neutral violates the Fundamento. One proposed solution to this problem is to introduce new root words for the gender neutral concepts: parent, sibling, grandparent, grandchild, etc.

Though none of these are widespread,  has appeared in books published by Jorge Camacho and Luiz Portella.

Epicene prefixes 
Various epicene affixes have also been proposed. They may be proposed instead of a masculine suffix—that is, gender derivation remains as in standard Esperanto, but the language gains a simple way of saying "a parent"—or in addition to a masculine suffix, often to avoid confusion between people speaking reformed and standard Esperanto. The only such affix commonly seen is the prefix . In standard Esperanto,  means both sexes together, and is normally only seen in the plural. In conversation, however, singular  is not uncommonly extended to meanings such as  "a parent" when a speaker either doesn't know or doesn't wish to reveal the gender of the noun. Many gender-reform proposals would make such usage official.

People who use  for "father" may avoid the unaffixed noun  "*parent" altogether as ambiguous, or may use it and switch to  only when they need to disambiguate.

Treatment of gendered words 
However, since  has numerous masculine uses, and there are already dedicated words for the neutral and feminine equivalents ( "adult" or  "grownup", and  "woman"),  is also commonly retained as a masculine root.

The word  "eunuch" has through back-formation given rise to the suffix  for castrated people or animals, creating forms such as  "steer", from  "cattle", to replace  "steer", though  "ex-" is sometimes seen in this context:  "castrated cat" (lit. "ex-male-cat") vs. .

Gender-neutral pronouns 
As in English, Esperanto has a personal pronoun for "he", and "she", . Paraphrasing  "he or she" to avoid mentioning gender is, as in English, considered awkward, exclusive, and is avoided in conversation and literature. There are two general approaches to resolving this issue: modifying an existing pronoun, and creating a new pronoun.

Extending the range of an existing pronoun 
The existing third-person pronouns are  "he" (the pronoun traditionally used when gender is not known),  "she",  "it",  "they",  "one",  (reflexive),  "that one".

 is used principally with animals and objects. Zamenhof also prescribed it to be the epicene pronoun for people when the gender of an individual is unknown, saying it was "completely correct grammatically". He most often used it for children, but also for adults with known gender:
 "the child is crying, because it wants to eat".
 "They are the lord of our place, lord viscount of ..."
The idea that  cannot be used for people is due to its use as a neuter pronoun. In Zamenhof's day it was customary to specify gender whenever it was known .

However, when gender becomes a problem it is much more common for people to use the demonstrative adjective and pronoun  (that one) as a work-around. Unfortunately, this remedy is not always available. For example, in the sentence,
 "Someone just said that he is hungry",
 "Someone just said that that person is hungry".
Similar problems of confusion arise with trying to use  "one" in such situations:
 "Someone just said that one is hungry".
This could be used to express deference or other forms of indirectness, but would not be understood to refer to the person who made the statement.

It would be possible to extend the use of reflexive pronoun , which officially cannot occur in subject position, to that of a logophoric pronoun:
 "Someone just said that himself/herself is hungry".
It also has the advantage of clarifying the sentence, since it is ambiguous in standard Esperanto whether  "he" refers to the someone who is speaking, or someone else. However, logophoric pronouns are alien to European languages, and this solution is rare.

Due to English influence, singular "they" has been reported:
 "Someone just said that they are hungry."

However this causes problems regarding Esperanto’s noun agreements and is not readily accepted by people of other language backgrounds.

New pronouns 

Existing Esperanto personal pronouns end in i, and only two proposals for a new pronoun are at all common:  and the blend .

As of 2019,  is the most popular gender-neutral pronoun proposal.

Another proposal is the blend , the reading pronunciation of the abbreviation  "s/he". It is frequently seen in informal writing.

{|class=wikitable
|+Gender-neutral pronoun proposals
! Type !!Traditional!!ri!!generic ri!!ĝi!!ŝli
|- align=center
!Epicene
|||||rowspan=3|||||
|- align=center
!Masculine
| colspan=2|||colspan=2|
|- align=center
!Feminine
| colspan=2|||colspan=2|
|- align=center
!Neuter
| colspan=5|
|- align=center
!Plural
| colspan=5|
|}

 Gender in plural pronouns 
In addition to removing gender from the singular pronouns, proposals have also been made to add gender to the plural in order to better translate material (such as the Bible) that was written in a language that has plural gender.

Due to the symmetry between  "he" and ili "they", the obvious choice is to make  masculine and to create an analogous feminine form, . This was proposed by Kálmán Kalocsay and Gaston Waringhien in the third edition of their Plena Gramatiko de Esperanto (pp 72–73, note 1). They cited the biblical passage Matthew 28:10-11:

"Then Jesus said to them [the women], “Do not be afraid. Go and tell my brothers to go to Galilee. They will see me there.” While they were going, ..."

It is obvious from context that "They will see me there" refers to the brothers. However, the identity of the "they" in "While they were going" is completely opaque. Kalocsay and Waringhien proposed the following solution:

 See also 
 Modern evolution of Esperanto

 References 

 External links 
 The Complete Handbook of Esperanto Grammar—a detailed account of Esperanto lexical gender. In Esperanto.
 The actual use of gender-neutral pronouns according to an empirical research study. In Esperanto.
 A critique of riism, supporting -iĉ- but criticizing ri as confusing, and proposing instead the pronoun gi. In English.
 Esperanto Idiosyncrasies: Sexism. Mentions the ri, gi, hi, ĝi, and -iĉ-'' proposals. In English.

Esperanto culture
Gender-neutral language

eo:Seksneŭtrala homa triapersona pronomo
es:Riismo
fr:Riisme
ko:리이스모